Lesser Antillean Creole may refer to:

Lesser Antillean Creole English
Lesser Antillean Creole French